The 2005–06 Welsh Premier League was the 14th season of the Welsh Premier League since its establishment as the League of Wales in 1992. It began on 27 August 2005 and ended on 22 April 2006. The league was won for the second consecutive season by Total Network Solutions, their third title overall.

League table

Results

References

Cymru Premier seasons
1
Wales